Dame Lorraine or Dame Lorine (Trinidad and Tobago) called Mother Sally in the land of its birth, Trinidad and in Barbados, is a historical Trinidadian Carnival Character. She is characterized as a voluptuously large woman who wears a long dress and dances in the mas. According to the Trinidad and Tobago National Library, the character is "imitative of the mas played by the 18th and early 19th century French planters, who would dress up in elegant costumes of the French aristocracy and parade in groups at private homes, particularly on Carnival Sunday night. They also performed the sophisticated dances of the period. The liberated slaves recreated these costumes – complete with elaborate fans and hats – in their own fashion, using materials that were readily available, such as assorted rags and imitation jewellery-type items, but emphasizing and exaggerating the physical characteristics, and dancing to small bandol and cuatro bands. they also put pillows or stuffings to make their behind and bosoms bigger". Where in the past mainly men dressed as the Dame Lorraine character, in recent years more women have portrayed the character.

References

External links
The Trinidad and Tobago Web Directory

Folklore characters
Caribbean culture
Trinidad and Tobago culture
Barbadian culture